Alesis is an electronic music company that designs and markets electronic musical instruments, digital audio processors, audio mixers, drum amplifiers, amplifiers, digital audio interfaces, recording equipment, drum machines, professional audio, and electronic percussion products. Based in Cumberland, Rhode Island, Alesis is currently held by the inMusic Brands company, owned by businessman Jack O'Donnell. Alesis products are designed in the United States and manufactured in China.

Early years

Alesis Studio Electronics was founded in Hollywood in 1984 by MXR co-founder Keith Elliott Barr. Leveraging his ability to design custom integrated circuits, Barr's company was able to introduce technologically advanced products at prices within the realm of most project studios. Alesis' first product was the XT Reverb. Introduced in 1985, the XT Reverb was an all-digital reverb that carried an unprecedented low price of $799. Barr recruited Russell Palmer as Operations Manager and Robert Wilson (Vice Chairman) to handle international sales so that Barr could continue to focus on engineering.

In 1986 Alesis produced the first under-$1000 16-bit professional effects processor, the MIDIverb, which had a 12-bit A/D converter and MIDI control. It was joined later in the year by the Microverb, which lacked MIDI but had a 16-bit A/D converter. After enlisting the expertise of Fast Forward Designs, co-founded by veteran Oberheim Electronics designers Marcus Ryle and Michel Doidic (who went on to found Line 6), Alesis introduced the MMT8 hardware sequencer and the very successful HR-16 drum machine in 1987. The HR-16 was employed on the English industrial metal band Godflesh's first few releases, and in that context Loudwire called it "the most devastating drum machine ever employed".

The Alesis ADAT

At the 1991 Winter NAMM Show, Alesis introduced the ADAT digital tape recorder. Alesis created the File Streaming Technology (FST) proprietary disk file system for their ADAT HD24 recorder. Each ADAT could record 8 tracks of 16-bit audio on an S-VHS videocassette tape, and up to 16 ADATs could be connected together to record 128 tracks of audio simultaneously.

Boom and bankruptcy
For the next ten years, Alesis created a wide variety of products such as the QuadraSynth synthesizer, D4 and DM5 drum modules and Monitor One studio monitors. In 1997, Alesis Semiconductor was formed, again taking advantage of Barr's custom integrated circuits to produce and market chips for the audio industry. A series of chips were introduced that ranged from digital signal processors for audio effects to analog-to-digital and digital-to-analog converters. By 2001, however, the company's business suffered as market trends changed, and on April 27 of that year, Alesis filed for Chapter 11 bankruptcy. In the subsequent restructuring, Jack O'Donnell acquired the company.

After 2001

Under O'Donnell's direction, Alesis expanded into new product categories such as mixers, portable PA speakers, and other recording equipment. At the same time, legacy Alesis products like the SR-16 drum machine continue to be produced and sold more than 20 years after their introduction. Today, Alesis continues expansion into new product categories in mobile music-making, recording, video, and live sound.

Alesis founder Keith Barr died of an apparent heart attack on August 24, 2010, at age 60. In 2012 Alesis became part of the newly created inMusic Brands group of companies.

Target market

Alesis products are intended primarily for studio and live performance (rather than practice use) and are now targeted at professional and semi-professional musicians. Alesis is known for budget equipment but has produced high-end and innovative gear such as the Alesis Fusion, Andromeda A6 analog synthesizer, Ion virtual analog modeling synthesizer, as well as the Ion-based Micron. Alesis developed equipment for recording studios during the 1990s.

Alesis models
Quadrasynth & Quadrasynth Plus synthesizer keyboards
Andromeda A6 polyphonic analog synthesizer
Fusion 6HD, 8HD synthesizer workstation keyboard
ION analog modeling synthesizer
 Recital, 61 & Pro stage pianos
 Virtue stage piano
 Concert stage piano
 Prestige & Prestige Artist stage pianos.

See also
 List of studio monitor manufacturers

References

Further reading

External links
Alesis Company Website
Jack O'Donnell – owner of Alesis and Numark, Pro-Music-News, 2001
Alesis SR18 Sound On Sound review (archive.org)

Manufacturers of professional audio equipment
Synthesizer manufacturing companies of the United States
Drum machines
Percussion instrument manufacturing companies
Privately held companies based in Rhode Island
Electronics companies established in 1984
Audio mixing console manufacturers
Musical instrument manufacturing companies of the United States
1984 establishments in California
Companies that filed for Chapter 11 bankruptcy in 2001
2012 mergers and acquisitions
Audio equipment manufacturers of the United States